The Anodin Family , is a French TV serial, in 8 episodes of 45 minutes, from 1956, on RTF.

Cast 
Alfred Adam
Claude Albers
Blanchette Brunoy
Jean-Pierre Cassel
Colette Castel
Yvonne Clech
Pierre Dac
Louis de Funès
Pierre Destailles
Jacques Fayet
Christiane Fédora
Anna Gaylor
Mona Goya
Jacques Hilling
Jacqueline Jefford
Margo Lion
Yves-Marie Maurin
François Nocher
Jean Parédès
Alain Quercy
Henri Vilbert

References

External links 
 

1956 films
1950s French television series
1950s French-language films
French black-and-white films
1956 French television series debuts
Films directed by Claude Autant-Lara
1950s French films